The Chemin de fer de Lyon à la Méditerranée was a short-lived railway company in the south of France.
It was formed in 1852 and merged in 1857 with the Chemin de fer de Paris à Lyon and others to form the Chemins de fer de Paris à Lyon et à la Méditerranée (PLM).

Origins

A concession was granted in 1843 for the line from Marseille to Avignon.
In 1850 a draft law was discussed to merge the Paris-Lyon and Lyon-Avignon concessions.
The city of Lyon opposed the merger since it would threaten its transit and warehouse operations, and it was agreed to keep the concessions separate.
Based on a law of 1 December 1851, on 3 January 1852 the concession for a line from Lyon to Avignon, which had been suspended since 1847, was given to a company whose members included Paulin Talabot.
The law of 1 December 1851 authorized formation of the Chemin de fer de Lyon à Avignon, owned by Genissieu, Boigues & Cie, Emile Martin & Cie, Edouard Blount, Parent (Bazile), and Drouillard Benoist & Cie.

History

The Chemin de fer de Lyon à Avignon company was formed by deed of 22 March 1852 to operate railway lines from Lyon to Avignon, Marseille to Avignon, Alès to Beaucaire, Alès to the Grand'Combe mines, Montpellier to Celle, Montpellier to Nîmes, Rognac to Aix and Marseille to Toulon.
A law of 8 July 1852 approved merger of the companies of Avignon-Marseille, Montpellier-Sète, Gard and Montpellier-Nimes with the Lyon-Avignon company.
The law approved an agreement on 19 June 1852 between the Minister of Public Works and the Chemin de fer de Lyon à Avignon.

The merged company had the concession to build the Marseille-Toulon line.
It was named the Chemin de fer de Lyon à la Méditerranée.
Talabot became its director.
The industrialist Jules Hochet (1813–1867) was an administrator.
The renamed company was recognised as an anonymous company on 8 December 1852.
The section from Valence to Avignon was opened in 1854.
On 16 April 1855 the line was connected from Lyon to Valence.
In 1856 the line was opened connecting the Paris-Lyon terminal of Lyon-Vaise to the Lyon-Marseille terminal of Lyon-Guillotiere.

Merger

The Paris-Lyon and Lyon-Mediterranean companies were not rivals, and recognized that they must merge.
This took place in 1857.
The combined Chemins de fer de Paris à Lyon et à la Méditerranée was constituted on 11 April 1857.

Notes

Sources

Railway companies of France
Railway companies disestablished in 1857
1857 disestablishments in France
French companies established in 1852
Railway companies established in 1852